KYMT (93.1 FM, 93-1 The Mountain) is a commercial radio station in Las Vegas, Nevada. KYMT is owned by iHeartMedia, and airs a mainstream rock radio format. KYMT's studios and offices are on Meade Avenue in Las Vegas, a mile west of the Strip, while its transmitter is on Potosi Mountain southwest of the Las Vegas Valley. From its high perch, the station's 24,000 watt signal can be heard over much of Southern Nevada and into California.

KYMT broadcasts in HD.  On its HD2 channel, it airs an Rhythmic contemporary format, known as "Real 103.9", which is also heard on a 250 watt FM translator station K280DD at 103.9 MHz. On its HD3 channel, it airs a Christian Contemporary format, known as "K-LOVE 93.1 HD3".

History

Adult contemporary (1980-1984)
In 1980, the station first signed on as KUDO, owned by the Quality Broadcasting Company, airing an adult contemporary format.

Hot adult contemporary (1984-1986) 
From 1984 to 1986 it shifted to Hot AC music and was known as "Music 93".

Smooth jazz (1986-1992) 
KUDO lasted for seven years until 1987 when the station switched to a new-age/smooth jazz sound as KEYV ("The Key").  The smooth jazz format remained until early 1992.

Adult alternative (1992)
In February 1992, The Key changed its format to adult album alternative or "AAA", retaining the "Key" branding.

Country (1992-1996)
This eclectic format was on the air for about 7 months, when a country music format began as "Hit Kickin' Country Y93," signing on in September 1992.  Y93 was one three country radio stations heard in the Las Vegas area.

Oldies (1996-2006) 
The station then switched to oldies in mid-May 1996, first as "Big Oldies" KBGO and then "Kool 93.1" KQOL-FM in 1998. The station continued airing an oldies format as "Kool 93.1" until August 2006.

Rhythmic hits (2006-2010)
On August 30, 2006, KQOL-FM flipped to a dance-friendly rhythmic adult contemporary format as KPLV ("93.1 The Party"). The station's playlist consisted of a mix of current and upbeat rhythmic pop/R&B/dance and classic disco from the 1970s, 1980s, 1990s and today. The station also aired Whoopi Goldberg's syndicated morning show, Wake Up With Whoopi.

The KOOL Oldies format continued on KPLV's HD-2 channel, where The Greatest Hits of the 1960s and '70s ran commercial free, 24 hours a day. In 2008, it was replaced with a gay-oriented dance format from iHeart, known as Pride Radio. On August 29, 2015, KPLV-HD2 began stunting with Christmas music, which led into the September 4 debut of urban contemporary "Real 103.9," simulcasted on translator K280DD 103.9 FM.

Top 40 (2010-2015) 
By 2010, KPLV moved to a more Top 40 format. In September 2010, KPLV was placed on Mediabase's Rhythmic panel. In April 2011, KPLV was moved to Mediabase's contemporary hit radio panel.

On July 1, 2012, KPLV rebranded as "My 93.1".

Rhythmic hits (2015-2016)
On April 12, 2015, KPLV temporarily rebranded as "#WhatIs931?" and used it as teasers. On April 17, 2015, at 9:31 a.m., after playing "Latch" by Disclosure, KPLV relaunched as "93.1 The Party."  Like sister station KPTT in Denver, it featured a Rhythmic/Dance Top 40 direction.

Adult hits (2016-2018)
On September 26, 2016, at Noon, KPLV flipped to adult hits as "93.1 The Mountain". The format change brought the Variety Hits format to the market for the third time, as it was previously aired on KKJJ from June 2005 through August 2010 and KVGS from October 2011 through January 2015. On October 18, 2016, KPLV changed its call letters to KYMT to match the "Mountain" moniker.

Rock (2018-present) 
In April 2018, KYMT shifted to a mainstream rock format, while retaining the "Mountain" moniker.

In 2019, KYMT began airing Las Vegas Raiders games in the team's last year in Oakland, California. In 2020, the games moved to KOMP and KRLV.

References

External links

Mainstream rock radio stations in the United States
YMT
Radio stations established in 1980
1980 establishments in Nevada
IHeartMedia radio stations